General elections were held in Palau on 1 November 2016 to elect a President and the National Congress. Incumbent President Tommy Remengesau was challenged by his brother-in-law, Surangel Whipps Jr. for the presidency, emerging as the top two in the primary elections on 27 September. Remengesau was subsequently re-elected with 51% of the vote.

Electoral system
The President and Vice President were elected using the two-round system. The 16 members of the House of Delegates were elected in single-member constituencies based on the states using first-past-the-post voting. The 13 members of the Senate were elected from a single nationwide constituency by block voting, with each voter having 13 votes to cast. The number of Senators elected to the Palau National Congress was planned to be reduced to 11 from the previous 13 for the 2016 general election, but this decision was reversed.

Presidential candidates
Four candidates had declared their intention to seek the presidency in 2016, including Remengesau, who was seeking re-election.
Antonio Bells, Vice President of Palau (2013–2017)
Sandra Pierantozzi, Vice President of Palau (2001–2005), Minister of Health (2001–2004), Minister of State (2009–2010)
Tommy Remengesau, President of Palau (2001–2009, 2013–Present), Vice President of Palau (1993–2001)
Surangel Whipps Jr., Senator

Campaign
The deadline to file nominating petitions for a presidential run was 3 August.

President Tommy Remengesau declared his candidacy for re-election on 1 March at a campaign kick-off held at the Ngarachamayong Cultural Center. Senator Surangel Whipps Jr., who began campaigning for president in 2015 and announced his candidacy earlier in the year, became the first candidate to file his candidacy with the Palau Elections Commission Office on 20 July 2016. Sandra Pierantozzi, the former Vice President under Remengesau, was the only woman to enter the race.

A presidential debate with all four candidates was held on 17 August 2016, at the Palau Community College (PCC). The debate was jointly sponsored by the Palau Media Council and the Palau Community College.

Results

President
The presidential primaries were held on 27 September, with Remengesau and Whipps Jr. finishing as the top two to advance to the general election on 1 November. Following their losses in the primaries, Sandra Pierantozzi and Antonio Bells both endorsed Whipps Jr.

Early results released on 2 November initially showed Whipps leading with 1,832 votes, with incumbent President Remengesau trailing with 1,667 votes. However, by 4 November, Remengesau had regained a slim lead with 4,108 votes, while Whipps trailed by just 78 votes, or 4,030 votes. The was decided by the absentee ballots, which the Palau Election Commission said would be counted after 8 November. Elenita Bennie Brel, the administrator of the national Election Service, announced that final results for the presidential would not be known until later in November, since absentee and provisional ballots would be sorted and counted in the presence of representatives of both presidential campaigns.  Bennie Brel explained, "We want to make this election very fair and transparent for everyone who has concern and wants to come in. So after November 8 the counting of the absentee ballots and then it takes another 15 days for the board [of the electoral commission] to certify them." On 10 November it was announced that Remengesau had been re-elected.

Vice President

Senate

House of Delegates

References

Palau
General
Election and referendum articles with incomplete results
Elections in Palau
Non-partisan elections
Presidential elections in Palau